Minhai COVID-19 vaccine, trademarked as KCONVAC, is a COVID-19 vaccine developed by Shenzhen Kangtai Biological Products Co. Ltd and its subsidiary, Beijing Minhai Biotechnology Co., Ltd.

Clinical trials 
In October 2020, KCONVAC started phase I clinical trials with 180 participants in China.Later, KCONVAC started phase II trials with 1,000 participants in China.

In May 2021, KCONVAC started phase III trials for global trials with 28,000 participants.

Children and adolescents trials 
In August 2021, KCONVAC started phase I trials with 84 participants in China.

In September, KCONVAC started phase II trials with 480 participants in China.

Authorizations 

On 14 May 2021, the vaccine became the fourth inactivated Chinese Vaccine to be authorised for emergency use.

References 

Clinical trials
Chinese COVID-19 vaccines
Inactivated vaccines
Science and technology in China